Greater Poland Uprising (also Wielkopolska Uprising or Great Poland Uprising) may refer to a number of armed rebellions in the region of Greater Poland:
 Greater Poland Uprising (1794)
 Greater Poland Uprising (1806)
 Greater Poland Uprising (1846)
 Greater Poland Uprising (1848)
 Greater Poland Uprising (1918–1919)